Nari is a village in the Jhunjhunu district of rajasthan, India with approximately 1,000 people. The residents are mainly involved in agriculture.

Cities and towns in Jhunjhunu district